"My Hands" is a song by Australian singer, songwriter and record producer, Running Touch.It was released on 12 July 2018. The song was certified gold in Australia in August 2019.

"This is my first collaborative project in production" speaking on collaborating with Berlin producer Alexander Freund. "I think it's the most natural sound I've committed to up until this point. This started off as a few notes on piano, and grew into something super different sounding in the studio. Lyrically, I wanted to build on a theme that doesn't really stem from a first person or third person point of view. No matter who you are, your hands are your hands, your love is your love. They don't belong to anyone else."

Track listing
1-track single
 "My Hands" – 3:41

Remixes
 "My Hands" – 3:41
 "My Hands" (Adult Art Club remix) – 3:31
 "My Hands" (Superlove remix) – 6:01
 "My Hands" (The Journey remix) – 08:08

Certifications

Release history

References

2018 singles
2018 songs
Running Touch songs
Songs written by Running Touch